Kőszeg (Slovak: Kysak) is a town in Vas County, Hungary. The town is famous for its historical character.

History 
The origins of the only free royal town in the historical garrison county of Vas (Eisenburg) go back to the third quarter of the thirteenth century. It was founded by the Kőszegi family, a branch of the Héder clan, who had settled in Hungary in 1157 AD.

Sometime before 1274 Henry I and his son Ivan moved the court of the Kőszegi, a breakaway branch of the family, from Güssing to Kőszeg (Güns). For decades, the town was the seat of the lords of Kőszeg (Güns).

Only in 1327 did Charles Robert of Anjou finally break the power of the Kőszegi family in Western Transdanubia, and a year later, in (1328), elevated the town to royal status. The town boundaries were fixed during the Anjou dynasty (1347–1381).

In 1392 the royal town became a fiefdom, when the Palatinate Nicolas Garai repaid a bond paid to King Sigismund of Luxembourg by the Ellerbach family from Monyorókerék. The Garai era ended in 1441.

In 1677 the secondary school, Jurisics Miklós Gimnázium (JMG), was founded. It is the oldest operating International School in Hungary. The International Baccalaureate (IB) program, which most English-speaking students at the school follow, was created at the Grande Boissière campus. It is a bilingual school, with instruction in Hungarian, French, German, Italian, and English. The International School is a testing center for the U.S. college boards (SAT, ACT,etc.), as well as the British IGCSE exam.

In 2006, the Herald Tribune listed it as one of the top ten international schools in the world.[2]

According to the Good Schools Guide International, "Students receive a truly international education and as a result, leave as rounded and worldly young people.

Little War in Hungary

In the third wave of the great wars against the Turks in the sixteenth century, Kőszeg became the major flashpoint of the campaign of 1532. Between August 5–30, Grand Vizier Ibrahim led 19 major assaults against the town. Under the leadership of the town and fort of Croatian captain Nikola Jurišić, a small garrison of only 700–800 Hungarian, Croat and German soldiers repelled an Ottoman force numbering over 100,000 soldiers in the Siege of Kőszeg.  After the final unsuccessful attack, the Turkish leadership were forced to decamp due to an uprising by the Janissaries. According to tradition, the last contingent of withdrawing troops were meant to have left the city limits around 11 o'clock. As a memorial to this historic heroism, the church clocks in the town have read 11 o'clock since 1777.

After the Turkish wars, in 1695 the garrison and surrounding areas of Kőszeg fell into the hands of the Esterházy dukes, where it remained until 1931.

The town lost its strategic importance after the Rákóczi-Liberation Wars of 1703–1711. Along with Szombathely, Kőszeg was the most important fortress for the kuruc military leadership from 1705–1708, to liberate and hold onto the areas west of the Rába.

The free royal town enjoyed the longest period of peace in its history during the eighteenth century. For the first time in the history of the town, there was an attempt, in 1712, to replace the population loss in the town by trying to attract colonists, and by founding Schwabendorf (Kőszegfalva).

Kőszeg had already lost its leading role in the garrison county of Vas by the mid nineteenth century. Only a few workshops survived the production crisis within the guild system during the Hungarian reformation of the early nineteenth century. The founding of public companies, societies, and the first financial institution in the county were the first signs of civic development in the town. Alongside the by then typical society made up of small businesses and small traders, Kőszeg developed during this time into a town of schools, sanatoria, and garrisons.

World War II and the Holocaust 
During World War II, the Jews of Kőszeg were among the last to be deported to Auschwitz in the summer of 1944. Later that year Nazis established a slave labor camp at Kőszeg where 4,500 died of typhus. With the impending arrival of the Red Army in 1945, the camp was liquidated.

When the Red Army approached Kőszeg in March, 1945, the Hungarian commander, Béla Király, surrendered the city to spare it further destruction.

Communist Period

After Communism 
Since 1992 Kőszeg is again living under a normal administrative system and a market economy. The financially feeble town is looking at options for renewal through an injection of capital from outside investors and is seeking support from government agencies and the European Union.

Kőszeg has managed to retain its natural charm and the beauty of its architecture. Only the bastion gates have been damaged significantly. The structure of the town remains unaltered.

Today Kőszeg is one of the most attractive towns in Hungary and is a tourist destination. Kőszeg was awarded the Hild Prize (Hungarian architecture prize) in 1978 for preserving its architectural heritage.

Every year, it hosts the Castle Days at the castle there, commemorating and reenacting the siege by Ottoman Turks on the way to Vienna, in which the defenders were able to hold out.

Demographics 

In 1880 Kőszeg had 7,301 inhabitants with ethnic German majority (in 1495, 1715, and 1784 a German majority existed also). The German citizens mainly were Lutherans, as in Sopron. During Austro-Hungarian times the city population was magyarized.

After the Second World War officially, 117 Germans were expelled, but in fact more German-speaking people were deported because the town's population declined from 10,320 (in 1941) to 8,780 (in 1949). During the communist era the remaining Germans assimilated to the Magyars. In 2001 Kőszeg had 11,844 inhabitants, 93.4% Magyars, 3.2% Germans, 1.6% Croats. The distribution of religions were: 72.2% Roman Catholic, 8.6% Lutheran, 2.5% Calvinist, 1.1% others, 5.5% Atheist, 10.1% no answer, unknown (2001 census).

Sights of interest 
 Jurisics Castle and Castle Museum
 Town centre with its medieval atmosphere
 Sacred Heart Church
 Steierhäuser
 Pharmacy Museum
 Hills around Kőszeg
 the Geschriebenstein (Írottkő)
 Seven fountains (Hétforrás)
 Watchtower (Óház)

Sport
Although the ski jumping facility is a small one, it is the only still in use in the country.

Twin towns – sister cities

Kőszeg is a founding member of the Douzelage, a unique town twinning association of towns across the European Union, including United Kingdom. This active town twinning began in 1991 and there are regular events, such as a produce market from each of the other countries and festivals. Other members of Douzelage are:

 Agros, Cyprus
 Altea, Spain
 Asikkala, Finland
 Bad Kötzting, Germany
 Bellagio, Italy
 Bundoran, Ireland
 Chojna, Poland
 Granville, France
 Holstebro, Denmark
 Houffalize, Belgium
 Judenburg, Austria
 Marsaskala, Malta
 Meerssen, Netherlands
 Niederanven, Luxembourg
 Oxelösund, Sweden
 Preveza, Greece
 Rokiškis, Lithuania
 Rovinj, Croatia
 Sesimbra, Portugal
 Sherborne, United Kingdom
 Sigulda, Latvia
 Siret, Romania
 Škofja Loka, Slovenia
 Sušice, Czech Republic
 Tryavna, Bulgaria
 Türi, Estonia
 Zvolen, Slovakia
 Horgos, Serbia

Kőszeg is also twinned with:
 Mödling, Austria
 Senec, Slovakia
 Senj, Croatia
 Vaihingen an der Enz, Germany

Notable people

Imre Festetics (1710–1790), geneticist
András Hadik (1711–1790), nobleman, military leader
Johann Baptiste Horvath (1732–1799), physicist
József Fabchich (1753–1809), writer and translator
Philipp Schey von Koromla (1798–1881), merchant and philanthropist
Friedrich Schey von Koromla (1815–1881), Austrian businessman
Nikolaus von Üxküll-Gyllenband (1877–1964), German businessman
Gyula Lóránt (1923–1981), football player and manager
Ágota Kristóf (1935–2011), writer
András Arató (*1945), electrical engineer and model
Zoltán Kereki (*1953), footballer
László Dvorák(*1964), wrestler
Henriett Koósz (*1980), Austrian wheelchair tennis player

Gallery

References

External links

 in Hungarian, English, German, Italian and French
Aerial photography: Kőszeg
History, pictures, and google map of Jurisics Castle

 

 
Populated places in Vas County
Hungarian German communities